Charles Timothy Slack (April 11, 1913 – June 1976) was a Republican member of the Pennsylvania House of Representatives.

References

Republican Party members of the Pennsylvania House of Representatives
1913 births
1976 deaths
20th-century American politicians